Desire plantation, also known as Alcidesire, is an historic Perique tobacco plantation built circa 1835, and located in Vacherie, Louisiana, St. James Parish. The plantation house was listed on the National Register of Historic Places in 1986.

History 
Desire LeBlanc was born in 1831, the son of Dominique LeBlanc and Perosine Bourgeois. He married Aglaé Bourgeois in 1854 and had a daughter, Alcidie LeBlanc, in the same year.

In April 1885, Alcidie married Louis S. Webre, who bought the Bellevue (Belleview) Plantation located on Bayou Grosse Tete in Iberville Parish. They had a son, Joseph M. Webre, in 1888.

See also 
 National Register of Historic Places listings in St. James Parish, Louisiana

References 

Houses completed in 1835
Houses on the National Register of Historic Places in Louisiana
Creole architecture in Louisiana
Houses in St. James Parish, Louisiana
National Register of Historic Places in St. James Parish, Louisiana
1835 establishments in Louisiana